Cyperus yadavii is a species of sedge that is native to India.

See also 
 List of Cyperus species

References 

yadavii
Plants described in 2006
Flora of India (region)